Marine Alutech is a leading designer and manufacturer of metal and composite boats in Finland. The company specializes in 5–20 meters boats and vessels for navies, coast guards, government agencies and port authorities. Marine Alutech has its own trading name Watercat.

References

External links
 

Manufacturing companies established in 1991
Privately held companies of Finland
Shipbuilding companies of Finland
Manufacturing companies of Finland
Finnish companies established in 1991